Snowboarding at the 2015 Winter Universiade was held at the Sulayr Snowpark in Sierra Nevada, Granada, from February 6 to February 13, 2015.

Men's events

Women's events

Medal table

References

External links
Snowboarding results at the 2015 Winter Universiade.
Results book

 
Snowboarding
Winter Universiade
2015
Universiade